Richard Peter Stanislav Krajicek (born 6 December 1971) is a Dutch former professional tennis player. In 1996, he won the men's singles title at Wimbledon, and remains the only Dutch male player to have won a major singles title. In the quarterfinals of that tournament, he delivered Pete Sampras's only defeat at Wimbledon between 1993 and 2000. Krajicek reached a career-high singles ranking of world No. 4 in March 1999. Since 2004, he has been the tournament director of the ABN AMRO World Tennis Tournament in Rotterdam. He is also the author of various sports books.

Personal life
Richard Krajicek is the son of Czech immigrants. In 1999, he married model, writer and hostess of Holland's Next Top Model and Benelux's Next Top Model, Daphne Deckers. Nicknamed "de Kraai" (Dutch for "the crow") in his home country, Krajicek has, among his siblings, half-sister Michaëlla Krajicek, also a professional tennis player. His distant cousin is Austin Krajicek. He is a member of the People's Party for Freedom and Democracy (VVD).

Career
Richard Krajicek began playing tennis at the age of four. As a youngster he won both the Dutch under-12 and the under-14 National Championships twice. His biggest achievement as a youngster was winning the Wiltshire Open in the UK after beating Steven White in straight sets in the final. He turned professional in 1989, and in 1991 won his first top-level singles title in Hong Kong and his first tour doubles title at the Dutch Open.

In 1992, the 1.95 m (6' 5") Dutchman reached his first Grand Slam semifinals at the Australian Open. He had to withdraw from this semifinal match due to a shoulder injury. The next year, he reached the semifinals at the French Open, where he lost in four sets to the defending champion Jim Courier. Also in 1992, Krajicek made a controversial comment regarding equal pay for women in Grand Slam events, saying, "Eighty percent of the top 100 women are fat pigs who don't deserve equal pay." Later, he jokingly clarified his comments, remarking, "What I meant to say was that only 75 percent are fat pigs."

At the 1996 Italian Open, Krajicek reached the final, before losing in four sets to the reigning champion, Thomas Muster. At the French Open later that year, Krajicek was the only player to take a set off the eventual champion, Yevgeny Kafelnikov, during their quarterfinal match.

Coming into 1996 Wimbledon, Krajicek had never previously progressed beyond the fourth round at the tournament and had lost in the first round in the two previous years. He was seen as a player with potential, having one of the fastest serves at the time, but was not considered to be a strong contender for the title. The clear favourite was Pete Sampras, who had won the title for the past three consecutive years. Despite being ranked within the world's top 16, Krajicek just missed out on the seedings for the tournament, but when seventh seed (and world No. 2) Thomas Muster pulled out shortly before the tournament due to an injury, Krajicek was declared the 17th seed and moved to Muster's place in the draw. Opinions differ, therefore, on whether he won the tournament as an unseeded player.

He beat former champion Michael Stich in the fourth round and met Sampras in the quarterfinals. By that time, he had managed to turn his notably weak slice backhand into an aggressive top-spin shot. Krajicek defeated Sampras in straight sets, becoming the only player to beat Sampras in a Wimbledon singles match in the eight-year period from 1993 until Sampras's fourth-round loss to Roger Federer in 2001. Next, he beat Australia's Jason Stoltenberg in the semifinals, and went on to face American MaliVai Washington in the final. He won the final in straight sets to become the first Dutchman to win Wimbledon.

In 1997, Krajicek's defence of his Wimbledon title ended in the fourth round, when Tim Henman defeated him in four sets.

In 1998, Krajicek was in the Wimbledon semifinals again, losing to Goran Ivanišević in a marathon match, 13–15 in the fifth set, with both players serving a combined 38 aces. His final attempt at a Wimbledon title was in 2002, when he lost in the quarterfinals to Xavier Malisse. Krajicek beat world No. 5 Andre Agassi, world No. 1 Sampras and world No. 9 Yevgeny Kafelnikov on his way to the Stuttgart Masters title in November.

At the 1999 US Open, Krajicek lost a quarterfinal matchup to Yevgeny Kafelnikov. Despite the loss, he set several most aces records that day. In the 2000 U.S. Open, Krajicek met Sampras in the quarterfinals, winning the first set and going up 6–2 during the second-set tiebreaker, but then losing six straight points and the match. In 2000, Krajicek was awarded the ATP Arthur Ashe Humanitarian award for his efforts to help youth in his home country. He was named ATP Comeback Player of the Year in 2002.

Krajicek retired from the professional tour in 2003. During his career, he won 17 singles titles and three doubles titles. His career-high singles ranking was world No. 4 in 1999. Krajicek's Wimbledon victory over Sampras proved to be no fluke, since he ended his career with a 6–4 record against the American player.

Since retiring from the ATP Tour, Krajicek runs The Richard Krajicek Foundation, which builds sports facilities for children in inner-city areas in the Netherlands. In 2004, Krajicek became the tournament director of the ABN AMRO World Tennis Tournament in Rotterdam.

In 2005, he published a book on tennis, Fast Balls (Dutch: Harde Ballen).

Grand Slam finals

Singles: 1 (title)

Masters Series finals

Singles: 6 (2–4)

Career finals

Singles: 26 (17–9)

Performance timelines

Singles

Top 10 wins

Bibliography
List of books written by Richard Krajicek:
 Een half jaar netpost (2003) with Tino Bakker
 Naar de top (2005) with Anja de Crom
 Harde ballen (2005)
 Honger naar de bal (2006)
 Alle ballen verzamelen (2007)

References

External links
 
 
 
 Richard Krajicek Foundation
 Sunday Times article 14 February 2010

1971 births
Dutch male tennis players
Dutch non-fiction writers
Dutch people of Czech descent
Hopman Cup competitors
Members of the People's Party for Freedom and Democracy
Living people
Sportspeople from Rotterdam
Wimbledon champions
Grand Slam (tennis) champions in men's singles